Dolly Vanderlip [Ozburn] (born June 4, 1937) is a former pitcher who played from  through  in the All-American Girls Professional Baseball League. She was born in Charlotte, North Carolina.

Dolly Vanderlip was one of the youngest players signed by the AAGPBL during its 12-year existence. At first, she attended a tryout for the league in 1950. She was 13 years old, by far one of the youngest girls in the training camp. She signed a contract with the Fort Wayne Daisies the next year, and debuted with the team on June 5, 1952, one day after her 15th birthday, under Jimmie Foxx management.

AAGPBL career
"Lippy", as her teammates nicknamed her, started her career as a solid relief pitcher before becoming a starter. In her rookie season, she pitched 10 games and went 0–4 with a 3.93 earned run average in 39 innings of work. She improved to a 2–2 record and a 2.88 ERA in 1953, appearing in 14 games while pitching 50 innings. Fort Wayne, with Bill Allington at the helm, won easily the league's title, but lost to the Kalamazoo Lassies in the first round playoffs. She posted a 3.00 ERA in two playoff appearances, working two innings, but did not have a decision.

Her most productive season came in 1954 with the South Bend Blue Sox, when manager Karl Winsch turned her into a starter. In 19 starts, Vanderlip finished with an 11–6 record in a high-career 120 innings. Her 2.80 ERA was the second best in the league, being surpassed only by teammate Janet Rumsey, who finished with a 2.13 ERA. Vanderlip also finished fifth in winning percentage (.647), sixth in wins, and tied for third for the most shutouts (4).

Bill Allington All-Stars
When the league was unable to continue in 1955, Dolly Vanderlip joined several other players selected by former Fort Wayne Daisies manager Bill Allington to play in the national touring team known as the All-Americans All-Stars. The team played 100 games, each booked in a different town, against male teams, while traveling over 10,000 miles in the manager's station wagon and a Ford Country Sedan. Besides Vanderlip, the Allington All-Stars included players as Joan Berger, Gloria Cordes, Jeanie Descombes, Gertrude Dunn, Betty Foss, Mary Froning, Jean Geissinger, Katie Horstman, Maxine Kline, Dolores Lee, Magdalen Redman, Ruth Richard, Dorothy Schroeder, Jean Smith and Joanne Weaver, among others.

Life after baseball
Dolly met her future husband Clement Ozburn during the tour. They married in 1958 and had two children. She went on to college and earned three degrees while attending Appalachian State University, the University of Iowa and the University of Wisconsin–La Crosse.

She is part of Women in Baseball, a permanent display based at the Baseball Hall of Fame and Museum in Cooperstown, New York, which was unveiled in 1988 to honor the entire All-American Girls Professional Baseball League. She currently lives in La Crosse, Wisconsin.

Career statistics
Pitching

Batting

Fielding

Sources

All-American Girls Professional Baseball League players
Baseball players from Charlotte, North Carolina
Appalachian State University alumni
University of Iowa alumni
University of Wisconsin–La Crosse alumni
Sportspeople from La Crosse, Wisconsin
1937 births
Living people
21st-century American women